Roepera is a genus of flowering plant in the family Zygophyllaceae. It is native to southern Africa and Australia.

Species
The genus Roepera currently has 60 recognized species:

 Roepera ammophila (F.Muell.) Beier & Thulin
 Roepera angustifolia (H.Eichler) Beier & Thulin
 Roepera apiculata (F.Muell.) Beier & Thulin
 Roepera aurantiaca Lindl.
 Roepera billardierei (DC.) G.Don
 Roepera botulifolia (Van Zyl) Beier & Thulin
 Roepera compressa (J.M.Black) Beier & Thulin
 Roepera confluens (H.Eichler) Beier & Thulin
 Roepera cordifolia (L.f.) Beier & Thulin
 Roepera crassissima (Ising) Beier & Thulin
 Roepera crenata (F.Muell.) Beier & Thulin
 Roepera cuneifolia (Eckl. & Zeyh.) Beier & Thulin
 Roepera debilis (Cham.) Beier & Thulin
 Roepera divaricata (Eckl. & Zeyh.) Beier & Thulin
 Roepera eichleri (R.M.Barker) Beier & Thulin
 Roepera emarginata (H.Eichler) Beier & Thulin
 Roepera eremaea (Diels) Beier & Thulin
 Roepera flava (H.Eichler ex R.M.Barker) Beier & Thulin
 Roepera flexuosa (Eckl. & Zeyh.) Beier & Thulin
 Roepera foetida (Schrad. & J.C.Wendl.) Beier & Thulin
 Roepera fruticulosa (DC.) G.Don
 Roepera fulva (L.) Beier & Thulin
 Roepera fuscata (Van Zyl) Beier & Thulin
 Roepera glauca (F.Muell.) Beier & Thulin
 Roepera halophila (R.M.Barker) Beier & Thulin
 Roepera hirticaulis (Van Zyl) Beier & Thulin
 Roepera horrida (Cham.) Beier & Thulin
 Roepera howittii (F.Muell.) Beier & Thulin
 Roepera humillima (Max Koch ex Tate) Beier & Thulin
 Roepera hybrida (Tate) Beier & Thulin
 Roepera incrustata (E.Mey. ex Sond.) Beier & Thulin
 Roepera iodocarpa (F.Muell.) Beier & Thulin
 Roepera kochii (Tate) Beier & Thulin
 Roepera leptopetala (E.Mey. ex Sond.) Beier & Thulin
 Roepera leucoclada (Diels) Beier & Thulin
 Roepera lichtensteiniana (Cham.) Beier & Thulin
 Roepera lobulata (Benth.) Beier & Thulin
 Roepera macrocarpos (Retief) Beier & Thulin
 Roepera maculata (Aiton) Beier & Thulin
 Roepera maritima (Eckl. & Zeyh.) Beier & Thulin
 Roepera marliesiae (R.M.Barker) Beier & Thulin
 Roepera microphylla (L.f.) Beier & Thulin
 Roepera morgsana (L.) Beier & Thulin
 Roepera orbiculata (Welw. ex Oliv.) Beier & Thulin
 Roepera ovata (Ewart & Jean White) Beier & Thulin
 Roepera prismatotheca (F.Muell.) Beier & Thulin
 Roepera pubescens (Schinz) Beier & Thulin
 Roepera pygmaea (Eckl. & Zeyh.) Beier & Thulin
 Roepera reticulata (H.Eichler ex R.M.Barker) Beier & Thulin
 Roepera retivalvis (Domin) Beier & Thulin
 Roepera rogersii (Compton) Beier & Thulin
 Roepera rowelliae (R.M.Barker) Beier & Thulin
 Roepera schreiberiana (Merxm. & Giess) Beier & Thulin
 Roepera sessilifolia (L.) Beier & Thulin
 Roepera similis (H.Eichler) Beier & Thulin
 Roepera sphaerocarpa (Schltr. ex Huysst.) Beier & Thulin
 Roepera spinosa (L.) Beier & Thulin
 Roepera teretifolia (Schltr.) Beier & Thulin
 Roepera tesquorum (J.M.Black) Beier & Thulin
 Roepera tetraptera (H.Eichler ex R.M.Barker) Beier & Thulin

Gallery

References

Zygophylloideae